Chung Yuan Christian University (CYCU) is a private university in Zhongli District, Taoyuan City, Taiwan. The university was established as Chung Yuan Christian College of Science and Engineering in 1955 by a group of Taiwanese and American Christian educators to train science and engineering talent in the Christian spirit. The school was upgraded to a full university and renamed Chung Yuan Christian University in 1980. CYCU is a Member of United Board.

Education mission and ranking
CYCU's stated mission is "to promote higher education for the benefit of the Chinese people, aiming at the pursuit and advancement of genuine knowledge in order to maintain our cultural heritage and, thus, to serve humankind."

As the University grows in reputation, the Ministry of Education has on several occasions evaluated and rated CYCU as the best private comprehensive university.

History
The university was originally established as Chung Yuan Christian College of Science and Engineering (CYCC) in October 1955 by a group of Christian educators and local gentry. The college comprised four departments: physics, chemistry, chemical engineering, and civil engineering. CYCC was renamed Chung Yuan Christian University (CYCU) on 1 August 1980.

Colleges
CYCU has 7 colleges, 26 departments, 24 Masters programs, and 12 PhD programs. CYCU has more than 70,000 alumni.
 College of Science
 College of Engineering
 College of Business (accredited by AACSB)
 College of Electrical Engineering and Computer Science
 College of Design
 School of Law
 College of Humanities and Education

Presidents
Dr. Samuel K.C. Chang has been the school's president since 2013. Past presidents and administrators include Kuo Ke-tee, Hsieh Ming-shan, Han Wei, Yuan Ta-nien, Yin Shiu-hau, Chang Kwang-cheng, Hsiung Shen-kan.and Cheng Wan-Lee

Notable alumni
 Chang Chia-hang, internet personality
 Chang Fan, Political Deputy Minister of Finance (2014-2016)
 Chiu Jeng-jiann, Deputy Minister of Science and Technology
 Hwang Jung-chiou, Chairman of Taiwan Power Company, Vice Minister of the Ministry of Economic Affairs (2009-2012)
 Yan Jeou-rong, Deputy Minister of Public Construction Commission
 Yu Hsiao-cheng, Deputy Chairperson of National Communications Commission
 Weng Chang-liang, Magistrate-elect of Chiayi County
 Wen-Hsiung Li, fellow of Academia Sinica specializing in Genomics

Name
Although similar in name, Chung Yuan Christian University does not have any relationship with the following universities in China: Zhongyuan University of Technology in Zhengzhou, and the short-lived  which was founded by Deng Xiaoping, existed in the 1940s and 1950s, and later merged into Zhongnan University of Economics and Law and Huazhong Normal University, both in Wuhan.

Tradition and Founding Principles 
In response to Taiwan's 2016 recognition of same-sex marriage, Chung Yuan Christian University released a statement in opposition, citing the university's Christian and Biblical founding principles.

Asteroid 
Asteroid 187636 Chungyuan was named in honor of the university. The official  was published by the Minor Planet Center on 25 September 2018.

See also 

 List of universities in Taiwan

References

External links 

 Chung Yuan Christian University

 
1955 establishments in Taiwan
Association of Christian Universities and Colleges in Asia
Educational institutions established in 1955
Universities and colleges in Taiwan
Comprehensive universities in Taiwan